Since its independence from France in 1962, Algeria has pursued an activist foreign policy. In the 1960s and 1970s, Algeria was noted for its support of Third World policies and independence movements. Since its independence, Algeria has been a member of the Arab League, the African Union and of the United Nations.

Algeria has diplomatic relations with more than 100 foreign countries, and over 90 countries maintain diplomatic representation in Algiers.

History of foreign relations since independence

During Ben Bella’s presidency (1962 – 1965) 
Following its independence in 1962, Algeria developed deep ties with many foreign countries with a heavy presence in the global scene. The Algerian government, pursuing the dynamics that had started during the Algerian War for Independence and into the Cold War used the country's strategic geopolitical position – at the crossroads of Europe, Sub-Saharan Africa and the Arabian world – to assert its own interests. Algeria came to see itself as a full actor in the Cold War and not simply a bystander caught in a crossfire between the Western and Eastern blocks. Moreover, Algeria played a central role in the creation of the Third World as a global political project, using its position at the intersection of international agendas – notably between non-alignment and Afro-Asianism positions, and between anticolonial and socialist movements.

Algeria at the center of the competition between the Western and Eastern superpowers 
Being a newly independent country from colonial rule of a Western power – France – and having waged a liberation war with a socialist orientation, Algeria was naturally inclined to turn towards the Soviet Union and its allies. However, the country's strategic advantages increased its importance to the eyes of the Western block. Primarily, France wanted to preserve its interests in the oil and gas exploitations in Algeria. As Charles de Gaulle stated to the Algerian finance minister in 1963, “If the Algerian government respects its commitments and takes into account our interests, it can count on our cooperation”. Hence, French economic aid continued to flow in Algeria, to insure  control on the petroleum and gas industry as well as maintain  continued use of Algerian soil to run atomic tests in the Saharan desert. Under Ben Bella, diplomatic relations with France were normalized, the negotiations concerning oil and gas leading to an agreement in 1964. As to the United States, they wanted to prevent Algeria from becoming yet another socialist country joining the ranks of the Soviet block. Hence, along with minor military equipment, the United States provided Algeria with a food program (PL-480) which delivered free food to the population. However, the Algerian commitment to supporting anti-colonial movements in Africa went against American interests in  the continent, which led to an indirect conflict with the United States and an increasingly hostile relationship between the two countries.

During the war for independence, the ALN had already benefitted from equipment, training and advice from communist countries: the USSR (though its help was quite timid until the final months of the war), China, Yugoslavia and Czechoslovakia. Moreover, ALN delegations had visited China and North Vietnam to learn from their guerrilla strategies. Help and support from the communist bloc therefore increased after independence:

 Even though Algeria was not a communist regime, the Soviet Union invested massive amounts of money and material help in the country. For instance, in 1963, the USSR granted $200 million in import credits for Soviet machinery to help build the Algerian industry, and committed to building a petrochemical research institute. The Soviet Union also agreed to buy agricultural products and minerals that Algeria was struggling to export. It was finally the country's main military supplier, providing planes, tanks, armored vehicles, ships, light weapons and ammunition for a total of 11 billion dollars from 1962 to 1989.
 The other great communist power, China, demonstrated its interest in Algeria as a fellow antiimperialist country. Hence, when Zhou Enlai visited Algeria in December 1963, he granted Algeria a low-interest loan of $100 million. Moreover, the Chinese were more aggressive in their support for armed groups fighting imperialist and neo-imperialist regimes in Africa. Algeria and China therefore cooperated on this matter, with China contributing to ANP training camps, and shipping weapons and revolutionary militants to Algeria.

The Sino-Soviet split strengthened the two communist countries’ competition for Algeria. However, China was inferior economically and militarily to the USSR, and could not match the USSR's industrial equipment and sophisticated armaments. Moreover, as the autogestion model proved to be widely inefficient, Algeria started to move towards a more centralized and Soviet-style economy by the end of 1964.

Algeria and the Third World project 
Ben Bella's foreign policy was marked by globalism, as it was not restrained to a specific culture nor geographical region. Rather, the project of the Third World and its diverse manifestations – the Non-Aligned Movement, the Afro-Asian People's Solidarity Organization, etc. – were meant to include all the developing and anti-imperialist countries, and Algeria intended to play a major role in its development.

This role is perfectly summarized by Amilcar Cabral’s – leader of the African Party for the Independence of Guinea and Cape Verde – famous declaration that Algeria was the “Mecca of revolution”. Indeed, the Algerian foreign policy had been influenced by Frantz Fanon’s and other radical Third World thinkers’ urgings to “export revolution” to other countries suffering from the yoke of imperial oppression. Therefore, the support of armed nationalists and revolutionaries was one of the foundations of Algerian relations with African countries. Ever since 1960, the FLN camps in Algeria's neighboring countries (Morocco, Tunisia and Mali) had been used to provide training and material help to revolutionary movements. By 1963, Algeria was offering refuge, funds, weapons and training to rebels from a dozen African countries: the left-wing opposition in Morocco, the secessionist Sanwi government in Ivory Coast, the Sawaba party in Niger, the CNL (or “Simbas”) in Congo-Leopoldville, the UPC in Cameroon, the MPLA and FNLA in Angola (250 recruits were trained in Algeria and 70 tons of armaments were sent to this country), and several armed groups in Zanzibar, Portuguese Guinea, South Africa and Namibia.

However, the Third World project also materialized through the various conferences and international organizations that united developing countries. Firstly, the Non-Aligned Movement, which was founded in Belgrade in 1961, and which Algeria joined shortly after its independence, defined the concept of non-alignment in the Cold War as a way for poor countries to exploit the conflicts and tensions and hence to promote their own interests. According to Jeffrey J. Byrne, the Algerian conception of the Non-Aligned Movement was that of a “political, goal-oriented and geographically unbounded anti-imperial solidarity”. The Third World coalition could therefore encompass Latin America countries, and even Europe ones like Yugoslavia. Algeria was particularly important in this sense, as it acted as a bridge between blocs and regions. For instance, its position at the crossroads of the Arab and the sub-Saharan worlds enabled Algeria to create links and unity between these two regions: at Algeria's request, Arab countries supported Angolan and other African revolutions, while African countries endorsed the Palestinian cause. However, these global Third World solidarity links went further than Africa: for example, the National Liberation Front of South Vietnam opened a permanent office in Algiers (one of only two that were located in non-communist countries). One of the most successful Third World projects was the Organization of African Unity, founded in Addis Ababa in 1963 to formalize and institutionalize the main Third World principles. Moreover, Algeria advocated for the creation within the organization of a “liberation committee”, the “Committee of Nine”, to support national liberation movements (even by military means). This embodies the Algerian view of Third Worldism: the institutionalization of collective defiance towards the imperial system.

Therefore, if the multipolarity of international relations – the traditional East versus West bipolarism, but also the intra-communist poles and the development of Third World alternatives – had benefitted the non-aligned states such as Algeria, the latter's increasing reliance on the Soviet Union – especially since the Sand War against Morocco in 1963 – risked jeopardizing the country's independence and its relations with other powers, such as the United States or China.

During Boumediene’s presidency (1965 – 1978) 
Algerian foreign relations during the presidency of Houari Boumediene marked a shift towards more stable and Algero-centered policies, in opposition to Ben Bella’s cosmopolitism. However, this greater focus on the country’s economic needs and traditional Islamic culture did not end the period of international ambitions.

Algeria’s centrality in the Third World 
Pan-Africanism and Pan-Arabism were strengthened during the Boumediene era. Algeria had joined the Arab League in 1962, and hosted its 1973 summit in Algiers. This strong relation with other Arab countries, notably with Egypt, was reinforced after Boumediene’s seizure of power. For instance, in 1966, Egyptian president Gamal Abdel Nasser sent thousands of teachers to support Algeria in the Arabization of its educational system. After Nasser’s death in 1970, Boumediene increasingly represented the political project of Pan-Arabism; and in 1973, Algeria played a major role in the organization of the war against Israel, as well as calling for oil to be used as a weapon in the OPEC. Moreover, in 1969, Algiers hosted the Pan-African Cultural Festival: this grandiose display of an African identity, forged from the continent’s common experience of Western imperialism, reunited anticolonial militants from numerous countries of the Third World. Far from being opposed, Pan-Arabism and Pan-Africanism were, under Algerian influence, united: Boumediène summoned an extraordinary session of the Organization for African Unity following the Kippur War in 1973, which resulted in the creation of a special committee to coordinate the Organization and the Arab League, and in the break of diplomatic relations of 42 African states with Israel. Finally, Boumediène presided over a larger and more powerful Non-Aligned Movement in 1973.

Algeria’s approach to international politics was motivated by the need for a “liberation” from the Western neocolonial economic superiority. Hence, in October 1967, Algiers hosted the meeting of the “Group of 77”, which united 77 developing countries on major revendications: a global reform of the terms of trade and a greater collaboration between Third World countries to set the prices for their raw materials. Furthermore, the main points of Boumediene's address to the United Nations General Assembly in 1974 – reparations for colonization and a transfer of resources from North to South – were adopted by UN. The notion of a “new international economic order” emerged as a way to reshape the world economy to the benefit of developing countries, based on the principle of sovereign equality between states.

A careful equilibrium between Cold War powers 
Boumediene took pride in Algeria's non-aligned status, by claiming its distance from both Soviet-style socialism and Western capitalism, while the country enjoyed an increasing prosperity. However, support from the Communist bloc did not halt. Indeed, because of their dependence on raw materials and their lack of hard currencies, commerce between Third World countries was negligible. The USSR, on the contrary, was able to deliver military equipment, industrial expertise, and trade outputs: the Soviets replaced France as the first destination for Algerian wine, and provided 200,000 tons of wheat when a drought hit the country in 1966.

Once again, the support Algeria received from the Soviet bloc was not exclusive to that of the Western bloc. Even though Boumediene took strong public stands, as when he claimed in 1969 after a summer of violence against Algerians living in France that if the French government could not insure the security of Algerian immigrants, he would repatriate them regardless of the cost, Algerian-French relations were progressively normalized during the 1970 decade. This posturing, like the nationalization of oil in 1971, served to increase his popularity in internal politics. However, France remained a model of prosperity, Algeria was still heavily dependent on France economically, and in 1975, French President Valéry Giscard d’Estaing made the first presidential visit since independence. More generally, Algeria continued to do business with the West, and avoided to be overly dependent on Soviet support. Indeed, despite the break of relations with the United States after the Six-Day War in 1967, the Americans had almost replaced France as Algeria's primary trade partner by the early 1970s. Therefore, the competition between the West and the USSR gave Algeria opportunities to diversify its economic partnerships.

During Bouteflika's presidency 
Since his inauguration in 1999, President Bouteflika has sought to extend Algeria's international influence, traveling extensively throughout the world. In July 2001, he became the first Algerian President to visit the US White House in 16 years.

He has made official visits, among others, to France, South Africa, Italy, Spain, Germany, China, Japan, South Korea and Russia.

Africa 
Algeria has friendly relations with other countries in the Maghreb, Tunisia and Libya, and with Sub-Saharan countries Mali and Niger. Algeria has taken the lead in working on issues related to the African continent. Host of the Organisation of African Unity Conference in 2000, Algeria also was key in bringing Ethiopia and Eritrea to the peace table in 2000. It has worked closely with other African countries to establish the New Partnership for Africa's Development. Algeria has taken a lead in reviving the Arab Maghreb Union with other regional Arab countries.

Americas

Asia

Europe

Oceania

See also
 List of diplomatic missions in Algeria
 List of diplomatic missions of Algeria
 Visa requirements for Algerian citizens

Notes

References